The Marcus Whitman Hotel and Conference Center is a hotel and historic building located in downtown Walla Walla, Washington. The hotel, colloquially referred to as "The Marc" after the fine-dining restaurant located on the first floor, is the tallest building in the Walla Walla Valley. The building was named for Marcus Whitman and has hosted several U.S. presidents, celebrities, and other notable people.  The hotel building was listed on the National Register of Historic Places in 1999.

History

The original thirteen-story tower was first planned by architect Sherwood D. Ford in 1927 and constructed shortly thereafter in 1928.
President Dwight D. Eisenhower was a patron at the hotel during the week of September 19, 1954, while visiting several dams in Southeastern Washington and Northeastern Oregon, bringing state-wide attention to the hotel. The then governors of Washington and Oregon, Arthur B. Langlie and Paul L. Patterson also attended the receiving events including a motorcade and performance by fourteen area school bands. Lyndon B. Johnson, trumpeter Louis Armstrong, as well as actress Shirley Temple were also patrons of the hotel.

After years of neglect, the hotel was in a state of disrepair, and was purchased by a local entrepreneur in 1999 who employed the services of an architectural firm that had restored several other historic buildings. The hotel has since gone major renovations, while still preserving the historic value and integrity of the building. Construction on a new wing of the hotel was started in 2000 and the renovations were completed in 2001, adding additional rooms and meeting spaces.

In 2017, following the death of Walla Walla native, Adam West who gained fame for his portrayal of Batman, the bat signal was projected onto the side of the hotel.

Awards

The hotel received the Valerie Sivinski Award for Outstanding Achievement in Historic Preservation Rehabilitation Projects from the Washington State Department of Archaeology and Historic Preservation following a major renovation in 2002.

The hotel was presented with the 2015 Hotel of the Year Award during the Annual Washington State Wine Awards. The Marc restaurant located in the hotel also received the 2015 Grand Award.

References

External links

Buildings and structures in Walla Walla County, Washington
Hotel buildings completed in 1928
Hotels in Washington (state)
National Register of Historic Places in Walla Walla County, Washington